Donald Shaw may refer to:

 Donald Lewis Shaw (1936–2021), American social scientist and co-founder of agenda-setting theory
 Donald Douglas Shaw (1834–1859), American politician
 Donald Shaw (academic) (1930–2017), professor and critic of Latin American literature
 Donald Shaw (rower) (born 1939), British Olympic rower
 Donald Shaw (musician) (born 1967), keyboard and accordion player for Capercaillie, a Scottish folk music group
 Don Shaw (baseball) (born 1944), American baseball player
 Don Shaw (screenwriter) (born 1934), British writer for film and television
 Don Shaw (volleyball) (born 1951), American volleyball coach